Workingmen's Party most often refers to the Workingmen's Party of the United States.

Workingmen's Party may also refer to:

Workingmen's Party of California
Working Men's Party (New York)
Working Men's Party (Philadelphia), Pennsylvania

Political party disambiguation pages